The 1984 United States Senate election in Maine was held on November 7, 1984. Incumbent Republican U.S. Senator William Cohen won re-election to a second term in a landslide.

Major candidates

Democratic
 Libby Mitchell, State Representative since 1974

Republican
 William Cohen, U.S. Senator since 1979 and former U.S. Representative from Maine's 2nd congressional district (1973–1979)

Results

See also 
 1984 United States Senate elections

References

1984 Maine elections
Maine
1984